{{DISPLAYTITLE:C12H12N2O}}
The molecular formula C12H12N2O2 (molar mass: 200.24 g/mol, exact mass: 200.0950 u) may refer to:

 Harmalol
 4,4'-Oxydianiline